Port Levy is a long, sheltered bay and settlement on Banks Peninsula in Canterbury, New Zealand. The current population is under 100, but in the mid-19th century it was the largest Māori settlement in Canterbury with a population of about 400 people. It is named after Solomon Levey, an Australian merchant and ship owner who sent a number of trading vessels to the Banks Peninsula area during the 1820s.

The bay was settled by the Ngai Tūāhuriri sub-tribe of Ngāi Tahu, and the chief Moki named the bay "Koukourarata" after a stream in Wellington that recalls the birth of his father, Tu Ahuriri. It was also the home of Tautahi, the chief after whom the swampland area Ōtautahi was named now the site of the city of Christchurch.

Koukourarata marae, a marae (tribal meeting ground) of Ngāi Tahu and its Te Rūnanga o Koukourarata branch, is located at Port Levy. It includes the Tūtehuarewa wharenui (meeting house). 

The three hapū of Koukourarata are Ngāi Tūhaitara, Ngāi Tūtehuarewa and Ngāti Huikai.

In popular culture 
Portions of the Peter Jackson film Heavenly Creatures based on the Parker–Hulme murder case were shot in Port Levy — specifically the scenes where Pauline Parker and Juliet Hulme, two 16-year-old girls from Christchurch, saw their imaginary Fourth World.

Church 

The earliest Anglican church in Canterbury was thought to have been built at Port Levy. This occurred at some time in the 1840s. A stone memorial marks the site.  It is inscribed “Te Turanga o te whare karakia tuatahi o te hahi mihinare o Waitaha. On this site stood the first Anglican church in what was to become Canterbury.” The current St Paul's Anglican church  was built in 1888.

References

External links 
 Website of the local rununga
 Recent community statistics
 Detail on Māori history
 Now part of Christchurch City
 "Heavenly Creatures" locations
 Biography of Solomon Levey

Banks Peninsula
Populated places in Canterbury, New Zealand
Ports and harbours of New Zealand
Bays of Canterbury, New Zealand